Mount Wanniassa is a mountain peak located in Canberra, Australia, nestled between the suburbs of Wanniassa, Farrer, Isaacs and Fadden. The mountain is part of the Wanniassa Hills Nature Reserve, a Canberra Nature Park and adjacent to the Farrer Ridge Nature Reserve. The mountain can be climbed via the established walking trails on the east and west slopes.

References

External links

Map of the reserve

Wanniassa